Jacob Evans III (born June 18, 1997) is an American professional basketball player who last played for the Santa Cruz Warriors of the NBA G League. He played college basketball for the Cincinnati Bearcats. As a junior in 2018, he earned first-team all-conference honors in the American Athletic Conference (AAC). He was selected by the Golden State Warriors in the first round of the 2018 NBA draft with the 28th overall pick.

College career
A  guard from Baton Rouge, Louisiana, he was a consensus four-star prospect in the 2015 high school class. Evans averaged  8.4 points per game as a freshman coming off the bench for Cincinnati. He improved his scoring average to 13.5 points per game as a sophomore.

As a junior, Evans was named first-team All-AAC alongside teammate Gary Clark, and he was a finalist for the Julius Erving Small Forward of the Year Award. In the NCAA Tournament, Evans scored 19 points, mostly in the first half, in the 75–73 Round of 32 upset loss to Nevada.
Evans averaged 13.0 points, 4.7 rebounds, 3.1 assists and 1.3 steals per game as a junior. He led the Bearcats to a 31–5 season and earning a No. 2 seed in the NCAA tournament. After the season, he declared for the 2018 NBA draft.

Professional career

Golden State Warriors (2018–2020)
Evans was drafted by the Golden State Warriors in the first round with the 28th overall pick. On July 2, 2018, he signed with the Warriors. The Warriors made it to the Finals in his rookie year, but were defeated in the 2019 NBA Finals in six games by the Toronto Raptors.

On October 24, 2019, Evans scored a career-high 14 points in a 122–141 loss against the Los Angeles Clippers.

Minnesota Timberwolves (2020)
On February 6, 2020, Evans was traded to the Minnesota Timberwolves as part of a deal for Andrew Wiggins.

On November 24, 2020, Evans was traded to the New York Knicks. The Knicks waived Evans on December 9.

Erie BayHawks (2021)
On January 26, 2021, Evans signed with the Erie BayHawks of the NBA G League. He was waived on February 2 after the BayHawks acquired Jordan Bell.

Santa Cruz Warriors (2021–2022) 
On February 23, 2021, Evans signed with the Santa Cruz Warriors and played four games for them at the end of the season in the playoff bubble.

On August 6, 2021, Evans signed with Hapoel Eilat B.C. of the Israeli Basketball Premier League, but he was released before playing in a game for the team. He joined Santa Cruz again, following his release.

Career statistics

NBA

Regular season

|-
| style="text-align:left;"|
| style="text-align:left;"|Golden State
| 30 || 1 || 6.8 || .340 || .267 || .000 || .8 || .8 || .2 || .1 || 1.3
|-
| style="text-align:left;"|
| style="text-align:left;"|Golden State
| 27 || 1 || 15.3 || .338 || .342 || .862 || 1.5 || 1.1 || .4 || .4 || 4.7
|-
| style="text-align:left;"|
| style="text-align:left;"|Minnesota
| 2 || 0 || 2.0 || .000 || 000 ||  || .0 || .0 || .0 || .0 || .0
|- class="sortbottom"
| style="text-align:center;" colspan="2"|Career
| 59 || 2 || 10.5 || .337 || .315 || .833 || 1.1 || .9 || .3 || .3 || 2.8

Playoffs

|-
| style="text-align:left;"|2019
| style="text-align:left;"|Golden State
| 7 || 0 || 2.6 || .400 || .500 ||  || .1 || .1 || .0 || .0 || .7
|- class="sortbottom"
| style="text-align:center;" colspan="2"|Career
| 7 || 0 || 2.6 || .400 || .500 ||  || .1 || .1 || .0 || .0 || .7

College

|-
| style="text-align:left;"|2015–16
| style="text-align:left;"|Cincinnati
| 33 || 8 || 24.4 || .372 || .333 || .804 || 4.1 || 1.6 || .8 || .8 || 8.4
|-
| style="text-align:left;"|2016–17
| style="text-align:left;"|Cincinnati
| 36 || 36 || 31.6 || .473 || .418 || .732 || 4.2 || 2.7 || 1.3 || .8 || 13.5
|-
| style="text-align:left;"|2017–18
| style="text-align:left;"|Cincinnati
| 36 || 36 || 30.8 || .427 || .370 || .754 || 4.7 || 3.1 || 1.3 || 1.0 || 13.0
|- class="sortbottom"
| style="text-align:center;" colspan="2"|Career
| 105 || 80 || 29.1 || .429 || .377 || .755 || 4.3 || 2.5 || 1.1 || .9 || 11.7

References

External links

 Cincinnati Bearcats bio

1997 births
Living people
21st-century African-American sportspeople
African-American basketball players
American men's basketball players
Basketball players from Louisiana
Basketball players from North Carolina
Cincinnati Bearcats men's basketball players
Golden State Warriors draft picks
Golden State Warriors players
Iowa Wolves players
Minnesota Timberwolves players
People from Jacksonville, North Carolina
Santa Cruz Warriors players
Shooting guards